National Sports Training Center is a football team based in Tainan, and is the football club for Taiwan's National Sports Training Center. It was merged in 2003 with the Lukuang football team, Taiwan's land army football team, after the option of alternate service in the Taiwanese militia. It participated in Taiwan Football Premier League.

History
Formerly known as the Lukuang football team or Taiwan Army football team, the NTSC football team belonged to the Republic of China Army and competed in the Chinese Taipei National Football League.

Since the Republic of China has the policy of conscription for all male citizens, qualified footballers could choose to join the Lukuang football team instead of the regular militia service after passing the tryouts. It helped the players to keep their form and provided additional selection and management to the Chinese Taipei national football team. As a result, most national team members have played for Lukuang.

In 2000, Lukuang quit the league due to military reform, but returned in 2003 under the new name of Taiwan National Sports Training Center football team and are affiliated with Taiwan's National Sports Training Center.

Naming Scheme

The Taiwan NSTC football team entered the Enterprise Football League with a different name almost every year.

 2006: Fubon Financial Holding Co. (富邦金控)
 2007: Chateau Beach Resort Kenting (墾丁夏都沙灘酒店)
 2008: National Sports Training Center (國家運動選手訓練中心)

Current squad

* Name spellings of some players have yet been confirmed. See :zh:台灣國訓足球隊 for their Chinese names.

Achievements

As Lukuang
Chinese Taipei National Football League:

 Runners-up (2): 1984, 1991
As NSTC

Chinese Taipei National Football League:

 Runners-up (1): 2007

Managers

 Jong Chien-wu (鍾劍武), 1991

See also

 Conscription in the Republic of China
 Military of the Republic of China

External links

 NSTC official website

Football in Taiwan
Military of the Republic of China
Military association football clubs in Taiwan